Economy rice or economic rice is a type of food or food stall serving many dishes accompanied by rice, commonly found in hawker centres, street vendors or food courts in Malaysia and Singapore.  In Singapore, it is commonly known as cai png, from the Hokkien .

Economy rice stalls typically consist of a case containing anywhere from 10-15 troughs of cooked food, including meat, vegetables, eggs and tofu dishes. Customers select any combination of these dishes, which are served accompanied by a portion of steamed white rice. In Singapore, it is more common to find the food on open troughs kept warm by hot water and an electric heater below.

Origins
Economy rice is thought of as a predominantly Chinese food; it is roughly analogous to the Malay or Indonesian concept of nasi padang or nasi campur (mixed rice). It is what most Chinese Malaysians and Singaporeans think of when they refer to "home-cooked" food, as it is similar to what would be eaten at home, with rice forming the basis of the meal, accompanied by various cooked dishes. Thus, there is no specific origin for the dish; instead it blends dishes and ingredients from the region they are cooked in.

Economy rice stalls thus evolved as a way for the general public to obtain a quick, and most importantly, cheap meal option outside of home. An economy rice meal is usually one of the cheapest options available for a meal at a hawker centre (hence its name), especially if one is judicious in choosing the less expensive dishes (generally vegetables and tofu).

Common dishes
Common dishes offered at an economy rice stall can include sweet and sour pork, braised tofu, braised cabbage, steamed egg custard, stir-fried Chinese vegetables, fried eggs, and an assortment of deep-fried items.

True to its Chinese origins, most of the dishes on offer tend to have their roots in Chinese cuisine.

Other names
Economy rice is known by several other names, and in general conversation it is rare for anyone to refer to it as such, even though many stalls tend to proclaim "Economy rice" on their signboards.

Other names for economy rice include jaahp faahn in Cantonese or tsa̍p-tshài-pn̄g in Hokkien and, colloquially, "point-point rice", named for the method of ordering one's meal which involves simply asking for a plate of rice and then pointing at the various dishes desired. Due to most people not knowing the chinese names of the dishes

Similar cultures in other places

Hong Kong
In Hong Kong, there is a kind of similar dish known as "two dishes with rice", or may also be humorously translated as "this this rice" (referring to the action of pointing at the troughs with dishes when ordering), and its name may vary with the number of dishes included in a set. Due to its low price, "two dishes with rice" has gained increasing popularity, particularly among the grassroot citizens of Hong Kong in the economic recession due to COVID-19 pandemic. Before the pandemic, this kind of dish has also been already popular in university and staff canteens.

References

Singaporean cuisine